Thirst of Men (French: La soif des hommes) is a 1950 French historical drama film directed by Serge de Poligny and starring Georges Marchal, Dany Robin and Andrée Clément. It was filmed and set in French Algeria.

The film's sets were designed by Raymond Gabutti and René Moulaert.

Cast
 Georges Marchal as Le sergent Léon Bouvard  
 Dany Robin as Julie  
 Andrée Clément as Alice  
 Paul Faivre as Broussol  
 Jean Vilar as Le typographe 
 Louis Arbessier as Collet  
 Pierre Asso as Le Toulonnais  
 Jean-Henri Chambois 
 Marius David 
 Mohamed Fatmi 
 Jérôme Goulven 
 Olivier Hussenot 
 Heddy Miller 
 Pierre Moncorbier as Le Savoyard  
 Geneviève Morel as La Savoyarde  
 Huguette Métayer 
 Henri San Juan 
 Pierre Sergeol 
 Christiane Sertilange as Adèle

References

Bibliography 
 James Monaco. The Encyclopedia of Film. Perigee Books, 1991.

External links 
 

1950 films
1950s historical drama films
French historical drama films
1950s French-language films
Films directed by Serge de Poligny
Films set in Algeria
1950 drama films
French black-and-white films
1950s French films